Nikolla Zoraqi (19281991) was a composer from Albania. His works included movie music and operas, notably Cuca e maleve. Zoraqi was an ethnic Aromanian and had a wife called Gjenovefa Hebën, also an Aromanian, with whom he had children.

References

1928 births
1991 deaths
Albanian composers
Albanian opera composers
Albanian people of Aromanian descent
Aromanian musicians
People's Artists of Albania
20th-century classical composers
Male classical composers
20th-century male musicians